Nicholas David Rowland Cassavetes (born May 21, 1959) is an American actor, director, and writer. He has directed such films as She's So Lovely (1997), John Q. (2002), The Notebook (2004), Alpha Dog (2006), and My Sister's Keeper (2009). His acting credits include an uncredited role in Husbands (1970)—which was directed by his father, John Cassavetes—as well as roles in the films The Wraith (1986), Face/Off (1997), and Blow (2001).

Early life and career
Cassavetes was born in New York City, the son of Greek-American actor and film director John Cassavetes and actress Gena Rowlands.   As a child, he appeared in his father's film Husbands (1970). After spending so much of his youth surrounded by the film industry, Cassavetes initially decided he did not want to go into the field. He instead attended Syracuse University on a basketball scholarship, but after an injury effectively ended his athletic career, he decided to rethink his aspirations, ultimately deciding to attend his parents' alma mater, the American Academy of Dramatic Arts in New York.

He has appeared in the films Face/Off, The Wraith, Life, Class of 1999 II: The Substitute, Backstreet Dreams and The Astronaut's Wife, among others. He has directed several films, including John Q, Alpha Dog, She's So Lovely, Unhook the Stars, The Notebook, and My Sister's Keeper.  He also adapted the screenplay for Blow and wrote the dialogue for the Justin Timberlake music video "What Goes Around... Comes Around".

Cassavetes finished in fifth place in the World Poker Tour (WPT) Invitational Season 5, attempting a bluff. He also appeared on season 5 of The Game Show Network's (GSN) High Stakes Poker.

He also has played himself in the season 7 opener of Entourage on HBO and Tattoo Joe as a cameo in The Hangover: Part II, replacing Liam Neeson from the cast due to scheduling conflicts.

Personal life
In 1985, Cassavetes married Isabelle Rafalovich. They had two daughters together before divorcing. Sasha was born with a heart defect and underwent substantial surgery; Cassavetes' film John Q. was dedicated to Sasha, and his later adaptation of My Sister's Keeper was based in part on Sasha's medical experience. 

Cassavetes later married Heather "Queenie" Wahlquist, and they have a daughter together. Wahlquist has appeared in several of his films, including a small role in The Notebook as Sara, a secondary character and best friend to the female lead Allie Hamilton, portrayed by Rachel McAdams. Cassavetes' own mother, Gena Rowlands, appears as the older, married Allie (Hamilton) Calhoun.

Filmography

Actor

Film

Television

Director

Writer

References

External links

Interview with UGO.com

1959 births
Living people
American male film actors
American writers of Greek descent
American people of Aromanian descent
American people of Irish descent
American people of Welsh descent
Nick
Daytime Emmy Award winners
Film directors from New York City
Syracuse Orange men's basketball players
Male actors from New York City
American male television actors
American male screenwriters
Writers from New York City
20th-century American male actors
21st-century American male actors
Screenwriters from New York (state)
20th-century Greek Americans